Deviko Gochayevich Khinchagov (born 4 September 1987) is a Russian former professional football player.

He also holds Georgian and Azerbaijani citizenships and is known as Deviko Khinjazov and Deviko Kenkadze.

Club career
He played in the Russian Football National League for FC Rotor Volgograd in the 2012–13 season.

External links
 
 Career summary by sportbox.ru
 

1987 births
People from Shida Kartli
Living people
Russian footballers
Association football defenders
FC Tekstilshchik Kamyshin players
FK Masallı players
FC Rotor Volgograd players
FC Sakhalin Yuzhno-Sakhalinsk players
FC SKA Rostov-on-Don players
Azerbaijan Premier League players
Expatriate sportspeople from Georgia (country) in Azerbaijan